John Edward Anderson OAM (born 24 July 1939) is an Australian sailor and Olympic champion. He competed at the 1972 Summer Olympics in Munich, where he won a gold medal in the Star class, together with David Forbes. He is the twin brother of sailor Tom Anderson.

In 1975, Anderson was part of the winning Soling class crew in the North American Championship and that same year, won the pre Olympic Regatta at Kingston. At the 1976 Montreal Olympics, he crewed the Australian boat which finished eleventh in the soling class. He was a member of the Australian Admirals Cup Team on Apollo II (1973), Love and War (1975), and Runnaway (1977). On 26 January 1987, Anderson was awarded the Medal of Order of Australia in "recognition of service to sailing". Anderson was inducted into the Sport Australia Hall of Fame in 1999.

On 14 July 2000, Anderson was awarded the Australian Sports Medal for "services to sailing, particularly youth and offshore". In 2009 Anderson was inducted into the Queensland Sport Hall of Fame.

References

External links
 

1939 births
Living people
1970 America's Cup sailors
Australian male sailors (sport)
Medalists at the 1972 Summer Olympics
North American Champions Soling
Olympic gold medalists for Australia
Olympic medalists in sailing
Olympic sailors of Australia
Recipients of the Australian Sports Medal
Recipients of the Medal of the Order of Australia
Sailors at the 1972 Summer Olympics – Star
Sailors at the 1976 Summer Olympics – Soling
Sport Australia Hall of Fame inductees
20th-century Australian people